Robert Drąg (born October 25, 1983 in Gorlice) is a Polish former footballer.

Career

Club
In January 2011, he joined Poprad Muszyna.

References

External links
 

1983 births
Living people
People from Gorlice
Polish footballers
Górnik Zabrze players
Kolejarz Stróże players
Sportspeople from Lesser Poland Voivodeship
Association football midfielders
Glinik Gorlice players